Kotkan Reipas is a sports club founded in Kristiina district of Kotka, Finland, in 1938. The club participates in floorball, ice hockey, and volleyball. 

Reipas football department played two seasons in the highest level of Finnish football, Mestaruussarja. Their home stadium was :fi:Puistolan urheilukenttä.

The club won the TUL championship of 1951 in basketball and the TUL championship in ice hockey in 1954.

Season to season in football

References

External links
 Official site
Finnish Wikipedia

Sports teams in Finland
Kotka
Sports clubs established in 1938
1938 establishments in Finland